The fifteenth series of the British medical drama television series Holby City began airing in the United Kingdom on BBC One on 16 October 2012. The series ran for 52 episodes, concluding on 8 October 2013. Many characters departed and arrived during the series.

Episodes

Production
The series is produced by the BBC and will air on BBC One and BBC One HD in the United Kingdom. Johnathan Young was the executive producer until Episode 40. As of Episode 41, Oliver Kent is the Executive Producer. Justin Young was the Consultant Series Producer until Episode 52, his last episode as writer was Episode 32.

Cast

Overview 
All 16 main characters from series fourteen initially returned. Derek Thompson returned for a guest appearance as Casualty's Charlie Fairhead in episode 2. Natasha Leigh joined as CT1 Lilah Birdwood for 8 episodes from episode 3. Sarah Jane Potts (Eddi McKee) left in episode 2, followed by Joseph Millson (Luc Hemingway) in episode 13. Guy Henry (Henrik Hanssen) was absent between episodes 5 and 12, though returned in a special episode set partly in Sweden. Ty Glaser and Rob Ostlere  joined the show in the New Year, playing foundation year 1 doctors Gemma Wilde and Arthur Digby. Rosie Marcel (Jac Naylor) was absent between episodes 16 and 20. Tara Lo (Jing Lusi) died in episode 27 after having an operation to remove part of her brain tumour. Jules Knight joined as of episode 31 playing core training year 1 doctor Harry Tressler. James Anderson (Oliver Valentine) left in episode 39. Aden Gillett joined in episode 42 playing locum consultant anesthetist Edward Campbell, ex-husband of established character Serena Campbell. Camilla Arfwedson joined as from episode 48 as foundation training year 1 doctor Zosia March. Guy Henry (Henrik Hanssen) left in episode 52, the series finale.

Main characters 
Jimmy Akingbola as Antoine Malick
Chizzy Akudolu as Mo Effanga

Camilla Arfwedson as Zosia March (from episode 48)
Bob Barrett as Sacha Levy
Paul Bradley as Elliot Hope
Hari Dhillon as Michael Spence
Lauren Drummond as Chantelle Lane
Aden Gillett as Edward Campbell (from episode 42)
Ty Glaser as Gemma Wilde (from episode 15)
Guy Henry as Henrik Hanssen (until episode 4, episodes 13−52)
Tina Hobley as Chrissie Williams
Jules Knight as Harry Tressler (from episode 31)
Jing Lusi as Tara Lo (until episode 27)
Rosie Marcel as Jac Naylor 
Niamh McGrady as Mary-Claire Carter

Rob Ostlere as Arthur Digby (from episode 12)
Sarah-Jane Potts as Eddi McKee (until episode 2)
Hugh Quarshie as Ric Griffin
Catherine Russell as Serena Campbell
Michael Thomson as Jonny Maconie

Recurring and guest characters 
David Ames as Dominic Copeland (episodes 28−34)
Jotham Annan as Nathan Hargreave (from episode 12)
Roger Barclay as Terence Cunningham (episodes 3−4 and 14)
Gareth David-Lloyd as Rhys Hopkins (episodes 3−12)
Maria Fernandez-Ache as Ramona Gomez (episodes 5−10)
Hermione Gulliford as Roxanna MacMillan (episodes 25-28)
Ben Hull as Derwood "Mr T" Thompson
Natasha Leigh as Lilah Birdwood (episodes 3−12)
Louis Payne as Jake Patterson (episodes 15−27)
Tessa Peake-Jones as Imelda Cousins (episodes 6−11)
Carlyss Peer as Bonnie Wallis (from episode 52)
Madeleine Potter as Sharon Kozinsky (episodes 30−46)
Derek Thompson as Charlie Fairhead (episode 2)
Sandra Voe as Adrienne McKinnie (from episode 18)

Notes

References
General

 Titles, credits, airdates and summaries: 
 Airdates and summaries: 
 Viewing figures: 

Specific

External links

15
2012 British television seasons
2013 British television seasons